The Jinping Mountains or Jinping Shan are a short north-south mountain range in southwestern Sichuan Province, China. The Jinping are located within Yanyuan and Mianning Counties, both in Liangshan Prefecture. This mountain range is notable for the Jinping Bend, where the Yalong River wraps around the entire Jinping range.

Geology
The Jinping Mountains are part of a complicated orogenic complex from the Indian subcontinent's collision with the Eurasian Plate and the resistance of the Yangtze Plate to the east.  The mountains are primarily composed of Triassic marble.

Geography
The Jinping are located in the complicated grouping of mountains called the Hengduan Mountains that transition between the Tibetan Plateau in the northwest to the Yungui Plateau in the southeast. The Jinping are sometimes classified as a southern subrange of the Shaluli Mountains, a component range of the Hengduan. The Yalong River separates the Jinping Mountains from the Daxue Mountains to north.

This peak is also known in Chinese as Jinping Shan (锦屏山) as the word for mountain can refer to either a mountain or mountain range.

This forms the dramatic Jinping Bend, known for its deep gorge and inhospitable terrain.

Human development
The Jinping's vertical relief and the Yalong River's  elevation drop from one side to the other make it an optimal source of hydroelectric energy. The Jinping-II Dam, a little further downstream, diverts the water of the Yalong River nearly  under the Jinping Mountains to the east side of the bend. More than 13.2 million m3 of earth was excavated for the construction of Jinping-II's power station below the mountains. A total of seven tunnels were bored through the Jinping Mountains at depths up to  beneath the mountain peaks. This included four water diversion tunnels, two auxiliary tunnels, and one construction drainage tunnel.

The China Jinping Underground Laboratory was developed along the southernmost Jinping-II tunnel through the Jinping Mountains.  This institution specializes in the research of dark matter as the location deep below the surface of the earth shields the laboratory from interfering cosmic rays.

References

Mountain ranges of Sichuan
Mountain ranges of China